Ángel Aranda (18 September 1934 – 4 July 2000) was a Spanish film actor. He appeared in more than 40 films between 1955 and 1980. He was born in Andalucía, Spain.

Partial filmography

 El guardián del paraíso (1955)
 Embajadores en el infierno (1956) - Giovanni
 Susanna tutta panna (1957) - (uncredited)
 Femmine tre volte (1957) - Atleta italiana di baseball
 Marisa (1957) - Luccicotto
 15 bajo la lona (1959) - Eduardo
 Molokai, la isla maldita (1959)
 They Fired with Their Lives (1959) - Falin
 El día de los enamorados (1959) - Emilio
 The Last Days of Pompeii (1959) - Antoninus Marcus
 The Big Show (1960) - Rudolf
 Un trono para Cristy (1960) - Ángel Reynosa
 Goliath Against the Giants (1961) - (uncredited)
 The Colossus of Rhodes (1961)
 Todos eran culpables (1962)
 La bella di Lodi (1963) - Franco Garbagnati
 Donde tú estés (1964) - Gunther Franck
 Bullets Don't Argue (1964) - George Clanton
 Diálogos de la paz (1965) - Julio
 Planet of the Vampires (1965) - Wess Wescant
 El Greco (1966) - Don Luis
 Che notte ragazzi! (1966) - (uncredited)
 The Hellbenders (1967) - Nat
 Cervantes (1967) - (uncredited)
 Javier y los invasores del espacio (1967)
 Fedra West (1968)
 La legge della violenza - Tutti o nessuno (1969) - Chris, the sheriff
 Susana (1969) - Pepe
 The Arizona Kid (1970)
 Underground (1970) - Sam Baxter
 Investigación criminal (1970) - Fernando Olmos
 Historia de una chica sola (1971) - Carlos
 La casa de los Martínez (1971) - Recién casado
 Los buitres cavarán tu fosa (1971) - Dan Barker
 La graduada (1971) - Don Carlos
 The Heroes (1973) - Cowlich
 Storia di karatè, pugni e fagioli (1973) - Clint Goldenhand
 Ten Killers Came from Afar (1974)
 A Dragonfly for Each Corpse (1975) - Pietro Volpini
 Marilyne (1976)
 El avispero (1976)
 Deseo (1976)
 Escalofrío (1978) - Bruno
 From Hell to Victory (1979) - (uncredited)
 Le c... de Marilyne (1980) - Padilla

References

External links

1934 births
2000 deaths
Spanish male film actors
20th-century Spanish male actors